João Ribeiro may refer to:

João Ribeiro de Barros (1900–1947), Brazilian aviator
João Ubaldo Ribeiro (1941–2014), Brazilian author
João Paulo Pinto Ribeiro, Portuguese football forward
João Ribeiro (footballer) (born 1987), Portuguese football midfielder
João Ribeiro (canoeist) (born 1989), Portuguese sprint canoeist
João Luiz Ribeiro (born 1959), Brazilian gymnast
Ponta João Ribeiro, cape located in the island of São Vicente

Ribeiro, Joao